Henry Dudley Wysong, Jr. (May 15, 1939 – March 29, 1998) was an American professional golfer who played on the PGA Tour in the 1960s.

Wysong was born, raised and lived all his life in and around McKinney, Texas. One of the people who taught Wysong how to play golf was Byron Nelson. In 1961, Wysong lost the final round (match play) of the U.S. Amateur, (8&6), to Jack Nicklaus at Pebble Beach.

Wysong won two events on the PGA Tour: the 1966 Phoenix Open Invitational and the 1967 Hawaiian Open. His best finish in a major was a 2nd at the 1966 PGA Championship, which was won by Al Geiberger. Wysong also finished T-8 at the 1965 U.S. Open.

Wysong later served as Vice-President of the PGA of America.

Wysong died in Plano, Texas after suffering an aneurysm at the McKinney Country Club where he was the golf pro for many years

Professional wins (3)

PGA Tour wins (2)

PGA Tour playoff record (1–1)

Other wins (1)
1964 Tri-State Open

Results in major championships

Note: Wysong never played in The Open Championship.

CUT = missed the half-way cut
"T" = tied

U.S. national team appearances
Amateur
Americas Cup: 1961 (winners)

References

External links

American male golfers
PGA Tour golfers
PGA Tour Champions golfers
Golf administrators
Golfers from Texas
People from McKinney, Texas
1939 births
1998 deaths